The 1909–10 IAAUS men's basketball season began in December 1909, progressed through the regular

Rule changes

 Continuous dribbling became legal; previously, a player could bounce the ball only once at a time, the bounce had to be higher than his head, and he had to recover the ball himself, in effect passing the ball to himself.
 The double dribble became illegal; previously, a player could make as many single-bounce dribbles as he wanted as long as he recovered the ball after each bounce (as if passing to himself each time).
 A player who dribbled the ball was allowed to shoot off the dribble for the first time; previously, a dribbler was not allowed to shoot the ball immediately after dribbling and had to pass it to someone else to shoot it.

Season headlines 

 The Intercollegiate Athletic Association of the United States (IAAUS) renamed itself the National Collegiate Athletic Association (NCAA) after the end of the season.
 The new rules allowing continuous dribbling rule and permitting a dribbler to shoot the ball off a dribble converted dribbling from a defensive tactic into a powerful offensive one.
 In February 1943, the Helms Athletic Foundation retroactively selected Columbia as its national champion for the 1909–10 season.
 In 1995, the Premo-Porretta Power Poll retroactively selected Williams as its national champion for the 1909–10 season.

Conference membership changes

Regular season

Conference winners

Statistical leaders

Awards

Helms College Basketball All-Americans 

The practice of selecting a Consensus All-American Team did not begin until the 1928–29 season. The Helms Athletic Foundation later retroactively selected a list of All-Americans for the 1909–10 season.

Major player of the year awards 

 Helms Player of the Year: Harlan "Pat" Page, Chicago (retroactive selection in 1944)

Coaching changes

References